Lambrichs is a surname. Notable people with the surname include:

Georges Lambrichs (1917–1992), French writer, literary critic, and editor
Jan Lambrichs (1915–1990), Dutch cyclist
Louise L. Lambrichs (born 1952), French writer

See also
 Paul Lambrichts (born 1954), Belgian footballer